Abbeyside–Ballincourty GAA Club is a Gaelic Athletic Association club based in Abbeyside, County Waterford, Ireland.  The club plays both hurling and Gaelic football and competes in both senior codes in County Waterford.

The club in its present incarnation was formed from the merger of Abbeyside Hurling Club and Ballinacourty Football club in 1967.  In essence, the present club can trace its way back to 1927 when Abbeyside Hurling Club was formed.  Ballinacourty Football Club was formed later in 1947.

The club still uses two separate names depending on which sport they are playing.  The name Abbeyside is still used as the name for its hurling teams, while its football teams still go under the name of Ballinacourty. The club was the 2007 Waterford club of the year

Honours

Waterford Senior Football Championships: 7
 1978, 1979, 1981, 2007, 2011, 2013, 2020
 Waterford Intermediate Hurling Championship 2
 1996, 2003
 West Waterford Intermediate Hurling Championship 4
 1994, 1996, 2000, 2003
 Waterford Intermediate Football Championship 2
 1965, 1998
 West Waterford Intermediate Football Championship 2
 1965, 1998
 Waterford Junior Hurling Championship 3 
 1950, 2007, 2008
 West Waterford Junior A Hurling Championship 6
 1946, 1950, 1966, 2007, 2008, 2013
 Waterford Junior Football Championship 2
 2007, 2009
 West Waterford Junior Football Championship 3
 2004, 2007, 2009
 West Waterford Junior B Hurling Championship 3
 1996, 2002, 2003
 Waterford Junior B Football Championship 1
 2015
 West Waterford Junior B Football Championship 5
 1995, 1996, 1999, 2000, 2015
 Waterford Under-21 A Hurling Championship 4
 1966, 2004, 2006, 2007
 West Waterford Under-21 A Hurling Championship 7
 1966, 1970, 2004, 2006, 2007, 2016, 2017
 Waterford Under-21 A Football Championship 12
 1970, 1971, 1979, 1998, 2003, 2005, 2006, 2007, 2008, 2012, 2017, 2018
 West Waterford Under-21 A Football Championship 14
 1969, 1970, 1971, 1979, 1982, 1998, 2003, 2005, 2006, 2007, 2008, 2012, 2013, 2015
 Waterford Minor A Hurling Championship: 4
 1970, 1976, 2003, 2004
 West Waterford Minor A Hurling Championship: 11
 1950, 1955, 1957, 1958, 1970, 1976, 1998, 2002, 2003, 2004, 2005
 Waterford Minor Football Championship: 16
 1950 (at St. Augustine Rovers), 1951 (as St. Augustine Rovers), 1952 (as Abbeyside), 1959, 1970, 1976, 1980, 1981, 1982, 1994, 1995, 2001, 2002, 2003, 2005, 2015
 West Waterford Minor A Football Championship:20
 1950, 1951, 1952, 1953, 1959, 1963, 1970, 1975, 1976, 1979, 1980, 1981, 1982, 1993, 1994, 1995, 2001, 2002, 2003, 2005

Notable players
 Dom Enright
 Greg Fives
 Austin Flynn
 Richie Foley
 Gary Hurney
 Michael Kiely
 Tony Mansfield
 Neil Montgomery
 Johnny O'Connor
 Conor Prunty
 Donal Whelan

References

External links
 Official website

Gaelic Athletic Association clubs established in 1927
Gaelic games clubs in County Waterford
Hurling clubs in County Waterford
Gaelic football clubs in County Waterford
1927 establishments in Ireland